This is a list of World War II battles, sorted by front location.

African Front

Middle Eastern Front

Mediterranean Front

Western Front

Atlantic Ocean

Eastern Front

Indian Ocean

Pacific Front

China Front

Southeast Asia Front

Citations and notes

Battles
Battles